Sychnovalva is a genus of moths belonging to the family Tortricidae.

Species
Sychnovalva chreostes Razowski & Becker, 2000
Sychnovalva crocea Razowski & Becker, 2000
Sychnovalva flavida Razowski & Wojtusiak, 2008
Sychnovalva simillima Razowski & Becker, 2010
Sychnovalva syrrhapta Razowski, 1997

See also
List of Tortricidae genera

References

 , 1997, Misc. Zool. 20: 129.
 ,2005 World Catalogue of Insects, 5
 , 2010: Systematic and distributional data on Neotropical Archipini (Lepidoptera: Tortricidae). Acta Zoologica Cracoviensia 53B (1-2): 9-38. DOI: 10.3409/azc.53b_1-2.09-38. Full article: .
 , 2008: Tortricidae (Lepidoptera) from the mountains of Ecuador. Part 1: Southern Highlands. Acta Zoologica Cracoviensia 51B (1-2): 7-41

External links
tortricidae.com

Archipini
Tortricidae genera